Joseph Rudolph Wood III was an American convicted murderer executed on July 23, 2014, at Florence State Prison in Arizona, with a two-hour lethal injection procedure that was described as "botched". Wood gasped and snorted for an hour and fifty-seven minutes after the drugs were injected, and the entire procedure took almost two hours; experts said the execution should have taken about ten minutes.

Background 
Wood had been convicted of murder and assault after shooting dead his estranged girlfriend Debra Dietz and her father, Eugene Dietz, on August 7, 1989. Wood was convicted of two counts of first-degree murder and two counts of aggravated assault against a police officer.  He was sentenced to death for each murder and received 15-year prison sentences, set to run concurrently, for the aggravated assault convictions.

Wood was scheduled to be executed with a combination of midazolam and hydromorphone, which had been used only once previously for the January 2014 execution of Dennis McGuire in Ohio. McGuire's execution had also been described as "botched" due to McGuire appearing to snort, gasp, and convulse during a procedure that lasted 25 minutes. From 1890 to 2010, the rate of botched lethal injections in the United States was 7.1%, higher than any other form of execution, with firing squads at 0%, the electric chair at 1.9%, hanging at 3.1%, and the gas chamber at 5.4%.

Execution 
The execution began at 1:52 p.m. MST and ended at 3:49 p.m. when Wood was pronounced dead. It involved injecting Wood with the drug cocktail of Midazolam, a sedative, and hydromorphone, a semi-synthetic opioid, each at a dose such that a single application of both drugs was supposed to be sufficient to kill him. Wood had to be dosed 15 times, during which he gasped and snorted for well over one hour, a media witness comparing Wood's breathing to a "fish gulping for air". One Associated Press reporter said Wood gasped more than 600 times. Experts stated that the execution should have taken about ten minutes.

Wood's lawyers filed an emergency appeal with the Supreme Court an hour into the procedure, requesting that the prolonged execution be halted. In the motion, they wrote: "He has been gasping and snorting for more than an hour. ... He is still alive." The appeal was denied by Justice Anthony Kennedy, with word coming half an hour after Wood's death.

After the execution, Debra Dietz's sister told the Associated Press: "What I saw today with him being executed, it is nothing compared to what happened on August 7, 1989," Jeanne Brown said, referring to Wood's murder of her father and sister on that date. "What's excruciating is seeing your father lying there in a pool of blood, seeing your sister lying in a pool of blood."

Aftermath 
Governor Jan Brewer ordered a review of the state's execution procedures, citing concern with the length of time it took Wood to die. Regarding the execution, Brewer said: "One thing is certain, however, inmate Wood died in a lawful manner and by eyewitness and medical accounts he did not suffer. This is in stark comparison to the gruesome, vicious suffering that he inflicted on his two victims – and the lifetime of suffering he has caused their family."

Charles Ryan, director of Arizona's department of corrections, said in a statement: "Once the inmate was sedated, other than sonorous respiration, or snoring, he did not grimace or make any further movement. Throughout this execution, I conferred and collaborated with our IV team members and was assured unequivocally that the inmate was comatose and never in pain or distress."

Stephanie Grisham, then a spokeswoman for the Arizona attorney general's office, who was also a witness, said: "There was no gasping of air. There was snoring. He just [lay] there. It was quite peaceful."

Dale Baich, Wood's public defender, decried the execution as a violation of the Constitution's prohibition of "cruel and unusual punishment", and said it could have been prevented.

On July 24, 2014, Arizona temporarily halted executions following the Wood case, pending a review of its procedures.

Executions did not resume in Arizona until 2022.

See also 
 Capital punishment in Arizona
 Crime in Arizona
 Doyle Hamm
 Execution of Clayton Lockett
 Execution of Dennis McGuire
 List of botched executions
 List of people executed in Arizona
 List of people executed in the United States in 2014

Notes

References 

1958 births
20th-century American criminals
21st-century executions by Arizona
21st-century executions of American people
People executed by Arizona by lethal injection
American people convicted of assault
American people convicted of murder
People convicted of murder by Arizona
2014 in American law
2014 in Arizona
People executed for murder
2014 controversies in the United States
2014 deaths
Deaths by person in Arizona
Executed people from Texas
July 2014 events in the United States